Fazlur Rahman Faridi (2 April 1932, Jaunpur, Uttar Pradesh, India – 25 July 2011, Aligarh, India) was an Islamic studies scholar, economist and a writer on Islam and contemporary Issues. He was the director of research and studies of Jamaat-e-Islami Hind.

Biography
Faridi completed his schooling in Jaunpur. He then went on to pursue his graduation and post graduation from Allahabad University and received a PhD in Economics from Aligarh Muslim University (AMU). He studied Arabic and Islamiat at Thanvi Darsgah, Rampur. He retired as a Professor in Economics after serving at AMU and King Abdul Aziz University.

He was the editor of Urdu monthly Zindagi-e-Nau and English magazine Radiance Viewsweekly and served as a board member of various Trusts. He was a member of Central Advisory Council of Jamaat-e-Islami Hind besides being a member of Zonal Advisory Council of Jamaat-e-Islami Hind, Uttar Pradesh.

He has about two dozen books, in English and Urdu, to his credit.

See also 
Jamaat-e-Islami Hind
Maulana Maududi
Mohammad Najatuallah Siddiqi

References 

1932 births
2011 deaths
Jamaat-e-Islami
20th-century Indian Muslims
20th-century Indian economists
Scholars of Islamic banking
Aligarh Muslim University alumni
Academic staff of Aligarh Muslim University
People from Jaunpur, Uttar Pradesh
Academic staff of King Abdulaziz University
University of Allahabad alumni